The 2011 Slamdance Film Festival was a film festival held  in Park City, Utah from January 20 to January 27, 2011. It was the 17th iteration of the Slamdance Film Festival, an alternative to the more mainstream Sundance Film Festival.

Festival
This year, Slamdance received over 5,000 submissions and programmed 83 films. It concluded with an Awards Ceremony at Treasure Mountain Inn. The theme of the festival was "All is not lost." For 2011, the festival donated 10% of its ticket proceeds in Park City back to the filmmakers.

The film Pete Smalls is Dead opened the festival. Michael Dunaway of Paste wrote "Rather than bring his new film to the senior festival, former Sundance winner Alexandre Rockwell chose to accept an invitation to open Slamdance this year because he says Slamdance is more fun." Dunaway wrote "most experienced Sundancers get a twinkle in their eye when they tell you about the exquisite little film they discovered either at Slamdance (Sundance's boisterous, irreverent stepsister) or in one of the more experimental categories of Sundance itself." At Slamdance, Paste was looking forward to the films Pete Smalls Is Dead; Drama; Last Fast Ride – The Life, Love and Death of a Punk Goddess; and Superheroes.

The festival had its second annual Filmmaker Summit, with an exclusive video on demand distribution agreement with Microsoft. Speakers included John Anderson of Variety, Scilla Andreen of IndieFlix, Orlando Bagwell of the Ford Foundation, Brian Newman of subgenre media, filmmaker and comic book writer Greg Pak, Amy Powell of Paranormal Activity, Jenny Samppala of Banyan Beach, Tiffany Shlain (director of Connected and Yelp), and Lance Weiler of Pandemic 1.0.

For the entire duration of the festival, select feature films in competition were made available via Zune Marketplace. The films included Modern Imbecile's Planet World, Snow on tha Bluff, The Beast Pageant, the documentaries Road Dogs and Scrapper, and also films from previous festivals.

This year, 17 films were available on video on demand through Xbox Live and Zune, in standard definition or high definition. Revenue was split 50/50 with filmmakers. 12 films from past festivals will be available throughout 2011 including the documentaries Off the Grid, Orwell Rolls in His Grave, Zombie Girl; and the narrative features Omaha: The Movie and We Go Way Back.

People attending the opening night festivities included Tim Roth, Peter Dinklage, Alexandre Rockwell, Lee Tergesen, Simon Arthur, Tommy Davidson, Fred Stoller, Angelo Tsarouchas, Steve Skrovan, Max Carlson, Tom Lenk, Lilly Ayers, Danielle Santos, Eva von Slut, INSAINTS members Daniel Deleon, Gregory Langston and Josh Levine, Michael Barnett, Kevin M. Brennan, Doug Manley, and Jeff Grace, and others.

David Burger of The Salt Lake Tribune wrote that the Slamdance Film Festival "claims it's the more indie-spirited festival — and when it comes to films about music, that boast might be true." He spoke to the filmmakers behind Last Fast Ride — The Life, Love and Death of a Punk Goddess, a documentary directed by Lilly Scourtis Ayers about Marian Anderson of INSAINTS; Pleasant People directed by Dave Bonawits; and Road Dogs, a documentary directed by Shane Aquino that follows the bands HTTH (Heavenly Trip to Hell) and Kettle Cadaver on cross country tours.

In an interview with The Park Record, festival president and co-founder Peter Baxter said attendance had been "excellent" and most of the screenings had sold out.

Awards
There were three competitive divisions at this year's festival: Grand Jury, Audience Awards and Special Sponsored Awards provided by Kodak, Panasonic, Dos Equis and Good Health. New this year, the festival added a theatrical distribution award for best feature, best short film, and selections from Grand Jury and Audience Award films. The films will be screened domestically throughout 2011, including at IFC Center in New York and 14 Pews in Houston. Strongman, a previous Slamdance Grand Jury Documentary winner opened in late January at the IFC Center in New York. Awards were sponsored by Adobe, Dos Equis, Kodak, Panasonic, Good Health and Pierce Law Group.

Grand Jury Awards
Grand Jury Sparky Award for Best Narrative Film - Stranger Things, written and directed by Eleanor Burke and Ron Eyal
Special Jury Mention - Joslyn Jensen's performance in Without, written and directed by Mark Jackson
Grand Jury Sparky Award for Best Documentary Film - Bhopali, directed by Van Maximillian Carlson
Special Jury Mention - Fordson, directed by Rashid Ghazi
Grand Jury Sparky Award for Best Animated Short - Bottle, written and directed by Kirsten Lepore
Grand Jury Sparky Award for Best Narrative Short - Bird, written and directed by Petr Stupin
Special Jury Mention - Son Of None, written and directed by Todd Looby
Grand Jury Sparky Award for Best Documentary Short - Oaks, directed by Charles Wittenmeier

Audience Awards
Audience Sparky Award for Best Narrative Film - Silver Tongues, written and directed by Simon Arthur
Audience Sparky Award for Best Documentary Film - Bhopali, directed by Van Maximilian Carlson
Spirit of Slamdance Sparky Award, sponsored by Good Health - Shunka, directed by CJ Gardella

Sponsored Awards
Kodak Vision Award for Best Cinematography - Shunka, directed by CJ Gardella (also received 10,000 feet of Kodak film)
Panasonic AF100 Award for Best “Road To Park City” Short Film Award - The Road to Park City is Paved with Artists, written and directed by Kevin Brennan and Doug Manley
Slamdance/Adobe Re-cut Competition Award - Nelson Vunda
Slamdance Theatrical Release Offer Award, Feature - Superheroes, directed by Michael Barnett; written by Michael Barnett & Theodore James
Slamdance Theatrical Release Offer Award, Short - Hello Caller, directed by Andrew Putschoegl; written by Tom Lenk

Films
The Feature competitions at Slamdance are limited to first-time filmmakers working with production budgets of $1 million or less.

Competition
10 narrative films and 8 documentaries were selected to screen in competition. 14 of them are world premieres.

Narrative competition

Documentary competition

References

External links
 Official site

Slamdance Film Festival
Slamdance Film Festival
Slamdance Film Festival
Slamdance
2011 in American cinema